Paja (also Romanized as Pājā; also known as Pāchā) is a village in Garmab Rural District, Chahardangeh District, Sari County, Mazandaran Province, Iran. At the 2006 census, its population was 51, in 15 families.

References 

Populated places in Sari County